"Break a spell" is the 14th single released by the J-pop singer Mami Kawada. The track is used as is the second ending theme song of the anime television series Tokyo Ravens.

Track listing 
 Break a spell
Lyrics: Mami Kawada
Composition: Takeshi Ozaki
Arrangement: Tomoyuki Nakazawa, Takeshi Ozaki
 remaining snow
Lyrics: Mami Kawada
Composition and Arrangement: C.G mix
 Break a spell (instrumental)
 remaining snow (instrumental)

2014 singles
2014 songs
Mami Kawada songs
Anime songs
Songs with lyrics by Mami Kawada